Saline Creek is a stream in Iron and Washington Counties in the U.S. state of Missouri. it is a tributary of Cedar Creek.

Saline Creek most likely was named for mineral licks along its course.

See also
List of rivers of Missouri

References

Rivers of Iron County, Missouri
Rivers of Washington County, Missouri
Rivers of Missouri